Cothill House is a day and boarding boys' independent school for preparatory pupils in Cothill, Oxfordshire, which houses around 220 boys from the ages 8–13.

General information
The school offers day and boarding places for around 220 pupils.  Facilities include a CDT centre, golf course, BMX track, swimming pool (covered), theatre, six hard tennis courts, 20 music practice rooms, 2 drum rooms, squash court, library, science labs, a computer room and two teaching blocks. A new state of the art Sports Centre is currently being constructed, due to be completed by the summer of 2023. The headmaster's house is attached to the main school.

The school is operated by the Prep Schools Trust, a charity registered in England, which also runs the nearby Chandlings School, Kitebrook Preparatory School, Mowden Hall in Northumberland, and Barfield School in Surrey. The Chair of Trustees is Emma McKendrick, headmistress of Downe House School.

From September 2023, the new headmaster of Cothill will be George May.

Boarding
Cothill House is a full boarding school, meaning pupils go home only for organised weekends, exeats, half-terms and end-of-terms. Day places are offered for Cothill Juniors in Years 4 and 5. Prince William and his brother Prince Harry were registered to attend Cothill, which was the choice of their father Charles, Prince of Wales, but in the end they both attended a rival establishment, Ludgrove, instead.

Notable Old Cothillians
Maharaja Gaj Singh of Jodhpore, diplomat and politician
John Bradbury, 2nd Baron Bradbury
General Sir Hugh Stockwell, Deputy Supreme Allied Commander Europe
James Charles Macnab of Macnab, Chief of Clan Macnab
Rupert Thorneloe, soldier
Alexander Gordon, 7th Marquess of Aberdeen and Temair
Thomas FitzGerald, Earl of Offaly
Jeremy Thorpe, British politician, leader of the Liberal Party 1966–76
Richard Symonds, civil servant.
Hugh Pym, British journalist and author
Archie Campbell, Marquess of Lorne, British aristocrat

History
The school was founded in 1860 (in Dry Sandford), before moving to its present location in 1870.

References

External links
Official Website
Cothill House at the Independent Schools Council

Boarding schools in Oxfordshire
Preparatory schools in Oxfordshire